Charles Perkins may refer to:

Charles Perkins (Aboriginal activist) (1936–2000), Australian soccer player and Indigenous rights activist
Charles Perkins (cricketer) (1854–1912), English cricketer
Charles Perkins (politician) (1906–1961), Australian politician
Charles A. Perkins (1869–1930), American lawyer
Charles Callahan Perkins (1823–1886), American critic and author
Charles Elliott Perkins (1840–1907), American railroad executive
Charles H. Perkins, founder of Jackson & Perkins Company
Charles L. Perkins, computer research scientist and author
Charlie Perkins (baseball) (1905–1988), American baseball player